Eldaniz Zeynalov (January 1, 1937 – November 5, 2001) was an Azerbaijani film, television and theater actor. He was famous mostly for his comedy roles.

Career
Zeynalov was born in Baku, Azerbaijan. He graduated from the Azerbaijan State University of Culture and Arts. He started his career after debuting as a painter in the 1963 film "Where is Ahmed?".

References

External links
 

1937 births
2001 deaths
Azerbaijani male film actors
Azerbaijani male stage actors
Azerbaijani male television actors
Actors from Baku